Quercus sichourensis is a species of oak found only in Yunnan Province in China. It is placed in subgenus Cerris, section Cyclobalanopsis.

Quercus sichourensis is an evergreen trees up to 20 m tall. Leaves are thick and leathery, elliptical or oblong, up to 21 cm long, bright green on the top but whitish on the underside.

References

External links
line drawings, Flora of China Illustrations vol. 4, plate 378, figures 6-8 at left

sichourensis
Endemic flora of Yunnan
Plants described in 1951